The Tyee is an independent online daily news source primarily based in Vancouver, British Columbia. It was founded in November 2003 as an alternative to "corporate media". Articles in The Tyee focus on politics, culture, and life. 

The Tyee was founded by David Beers, an award-winning writer and former features editor at The Vancouver Sun. Over the years the outlet has attracted attention not just for its news coverage, but also for its non-traditional funding model. The Neiman Lab called it one if the “kookiest” revenue strategies it had ever seen, incorporating advertising, donations and equity sales in its funding model, and even renting out space in its newsrooms. 

Since its launch, The Tyee has featured a number of notable writers, including Andrew Nikiforuk, Andrew MacLeod, Katie Hyslop, Crawford Kilian, Michael Harris, Colleen Kimmett, Geoff Dembicki, Charles Campbell, Christopher Cheung, Tom Barrett, Sarah Berman, Chris Wood, Ian Gill, Chris Pollon, Steve Burgess, Murray Dobbin, Michael Geist, Terry Glavin, Mark Leiren-Young, Rafe Mair, Will McMartin, Shannon Rupp, Vanessa Richmond and Dorothy Woodend.

In 2015, The New Yorker magazine called The Tyee "a fascinating case study" of how local journalism is funded. 

The Tyee reported its site received approximately 8 million visitors in 2021, with similar readership figures the year before.

History

Creation 
In 2001, David Beers was fired from the features editor position at The Vancouver Sun as part of a slate of layoffs across Canwest Global's properties. Beers says, "When I was fired it was kind of a wake-up call, I was writing some forthright things after 9/11—they weren't radical, I didn't think, but they challenged the jingoistic tone of many commentators and politicians in Canada as well as the US." 

The Tyee launched in November 2003. Its original premise was "investigative reporting no one else is doing, and fresh viewpoints from all over B.C."

Name 
The name "Tyee" is based on the current local definition of Tyee salmon — a Chinook or Spring salmon weighing 30 lbs or more. The word is derived from the Nuu-chah-nulth language and means chief, king, or champion. According to founder David Beers, the name embodies the magazine's dedication to publishing "lively, informative news and views", and because staff "roam free, and go where we wish." While an illustration of a Chinook salmon was originally used in The Tyee's logo, it was removed in 2022 because "the word [Tyee] meant so much more to the people who created it".

"The Hook" 
In 2008, The Tyee launched a new blog called The Hook. According to investigative editor and overseer, Monte Paulsen, The Hook was a "superblog" because it published quick, frequent, timely reports and analyses by experienced Tyee journalists and a wide network of contributors, unlike most blogs that offer works of one or two journalists. Posts were approximately 200-300 words in length, allowing coverage of a greater number and variety of topics. The Hook was retired in 2014.

Recent years 
The Tyee is a founding member of independent media association Press Forward, which launched in December 2020.

On Dec. 3, 2021, Robyn Smith announced she'd be leaving her editor-in-chief role that March, with founder David Beers stepping in as interim editor-in-chief. On Feb. 16, 2022, The Tyee announced senior editor andrea bennett would become managing editor, with contributor Jackie Wong joining The Tyee as the outlet's new senior editor. 

On Feb. 28, 2022, Jeanette Ageson and David Beers announced the media outlet had transitioned to a non-profit model at the start of the year, a process that had been in the works since 2018. Peter Klein, Michelle Hoar, Melody Ma and Deblekha Guin joined The Tyee as its board of directors. The Tyee is now operated by The Tyee Independent Media Society.

Ageson and Beers wrote the outlet's non-profit status makes it clear that "we do not exist to enrich any owner. We won’t be bought or sold or merged. We will spend every dollar on more and better journalism." The announcement was accompanied by a logo and website redesign.

Awards 
In 2007, The Tyee was recognized nationally by the Canadian Journalism Foundation with an Honourable Mention in the category of Excellence in Journalism for Small, Medium, or Local Media. The category includes all Canadian online journalism with fewer than 500,000 unique visitors a month. 

The Tyee was awarded the Edward R. Murrow Award by the Radio and Television News Directors Association in 2009 and 2011. It was the only Canadian news organization to be honoured for the national (North America-wide) category in 2011. 

The Tyee won the Canadian Journalism Foundation Excellence in Journalism Award in 2009 and 2011. 

At 2020 Digital Publishing Awards, The Tyee received gold for General Excellence in the Small Publication category.

The Tyee was awarded The Bill Good Award for making "a significant contribution to journalism in the province" at the 2021 Webster Awards. The same year, it won "B.C. Magazine of the Year" at the Alberta Magazine Awards.

Funding 
In 2010, according to Beers, The Tyee's annual revenue of about $500,000 to $600,000 included $450,000 from ongoing sale of equity, $75,000 from advertising, $50,000 from grants, $25,000 from reader donations, and several thousand from renting out newsroom desks. The outlet has steadily increased its reliance on reader donations since 2009 through its Tyee Builders membership program.

The Tyee has been commended for its creative and unique fundraising efforts, from offering merchandise and signed books to giving donors editorial sway. For example, Beers provided donors a choice of which issues The Tyee should cover during Canada's 2009 elections — the pledge brought in $25,000 in 10 days. In 2014, a campaign to “take The Tyee national” raised $118,000 in three weeks.

Until 2018, The Tyee was owned by a majority and minority shareholder. The majority shareholder was Working Enterprises, a family of companies affiliated with the British Columbia Federation of Labor that also includes insurance, travel and financial services firms that cater to Canadian union members. In exchange for an annual subsidy of $300,000, Working Enterprises owned two-thirds of The Tyee's theoretically for-profit operation. Investors Eric Peterson and Christina Munck were The Tyee’s minority shareholder at the time. In 2018, Peterson and Munck were asked to step in as the outlet's sole investor. 

In a 2016 Canadaland interview with Jesse Brown, Beers said that "special interests" always fund media. "I can't imagine a media that isn't funded by special interest".

In 2019, The Tyee projected 29 per cent of its annual revenue would come from reader contributions. By 2020, that number had risen to 34 per cent and in 2021 The Tyee reported 47 per cent of its revenue came from reader donations.

Non-profit status 
On Feb. 28, 2022, Beers and publisher Jeanette Ageson announced the media outlet had transitioned to a non-profit model, a process that had been in the works since 2018. Regarding the non-profit transition, Eric Peterson wrote in a March 1, 2022 op-ed on the site: "It is ultimately contradictory for an entity that purports to champion independent journalism to be privately owned, even if its owners are merely caretakers".

References 

Canadian news websites
Publications established in 2003
Organizations based in Vancouver